USS Swift was a small 12-ton schooner captured  by the Union Navy during the Union blockade of the American Civil War.

Swift was used by the Union Navy as a ship’s tender, serving ships at Tybee Island, Georgia, and at Port Royal, South Carolina.

Service history 

Swift was a small schooner captured by the monitor  on 9 February 1864 in Wassau Sound, Georgia. No record has been found of any filing of libel papers against the schooner, but she was taken into the South Atlantic Blockading Squadron. The vessel served at Tybee Island, Georgia, and at Port Royal, South Carolina, as a ship's tender. Swift was sold at public auction there on 8 August 1865.

References 

Ships of the Union Navy
Schooners of the United States Navy
Tenders of the United States Navy
American Civil War auxiliary ships of the United States